Isaac Anderson-Henry of Woodend FRSE (né Anderson, 1800 – 21 September 1884) was a Scottish lawyer and horticulturist.

Life
A lawyer in practice in Edinburgh, he is shown as Isaac Anderson SSC in 1840, living at 14 Maryfield, and having offices nearby at 4 Montgomery Street.

He retired from law practice in 1861 upon his wife's inheritance of estates in Woodend, Perthshire, when he changed his name to Anderson-Henry, enabling him to pursue horticulture.  He was president of the Botanical Society of Edinburgh (1866-7), and collected plants from right around the world, including the Andes, north-western Himalayas, and New Zealand.  He studied plant hybridisation in a time that was before the rediscovery of genetics, and was a sometime correspondent of Charles Darwin.

In 1869 he was elected a Fellow of the Royal Society of Edinburgh his proposer being John Hutton Balfour.

In his final years he lived at Hay Lodge in Trinity, Edinburgh.

References

1800 births
1884 deaths
Scottish horticulturists
Scottish lawyers